The 1978 Singapore flood was one of the worst floods in Singapore's history. Seven people were killed and more than a thousand residents were evacuated from their homes by the army and police boats from five affected areas. Total damage reached S$10 million, the worst flood since the Hari Raya floods that hit the island in December 1969.

References

National Library Board, Singapore's worst floods, 1999.
MINDEF, The Flood of 1978, 7 December 1998.

1978 Singapore
Singapore Flood, 1978
Singapore Flood, 1978
December 1978 events in Asia
1978 disasters in Singapore